Masi Torello is a comune (municipality) in the Province of Ferrara in the Italian region Emilia-Romagna, located about  northeast of Bologna and about  east of Ferrara.

The municipality of Masi Torello contains the frazione (subdivision) Masi San Giacomo.

Masi Torello borders the following municipalities: Ferrara, Ostellato, Portomaggiore, Voghiera.

Demographic evolution

References

External links
 www.comune.masitorello.fe.it/

Cities and towns in Emilia-Romagna